Elsie Evelin Shaw ( Maguire, 7 August 1908 – 1989) was an English athlete who competed in the 1934 British Empire Games.

Maguire was born in August 1908 in Kensington, London. She married William Frederick Shaw in June 1935 in Hackney, London.

At the 1934 Empire Games she was a member of the English relay team which won the gold medal in the 110-220-110 yards event. In the 100 yards competition she finished fourth.

Shaw died in Brent, London in 1989 at the age of 81.

References

External links
Profile at TOPS in athletics

1908 births
1989 deaths
Athletes (track and field) at the 1934 British Empire Games
Commonwealth Games gold medallists for England
Commonwealth Games medallists in athletics
English female sprinters
Medallists at the 1934 British Empire Games